Mexicoscylus nigritarse is a species of beetle in the family Cerambycidae. It was described by Galileo and Martins in 2013. It is known from Costa Rica.

References

Hemilophini
Beetles described in 2013